I Cheated the Law is a 1949 American crime film directed by Edward L. Cahn and written by Richard G. Hubler. The film stars Tom Conway, Steve Brodie, Robert Osterloh, Barbara Billingsley, Russell Hicks and James Seay. The film was released on March 4, 1949, by 20th Century Fox.

Plot

In court, criminal attorney John Campbell defends a man, Frank Bricolle, who is charged with murdering a night watchman in a fur warehouse during a robbery. Frank having saved his life during the war, John believes in him so much that both he and wife Ruth provide the defendant with an alibi, resulting in his acquittal.

Frank later confesses to John how he did indeed commit the crime, aided by Joe Corsi and other accomplices. John expresses regret for his actions and leaves Ruth, wanting to be alone for a while. He is actually busy scheming to frame Corsi for the murder. Corsi tries to avoid a conviction by accusing Bricolle in the courtroom, where Bricolle pulls a gun and tries to shoot his way out. He is killed, and John returns home to Ruth.

Cast   
Tom Conway as John Campbell
Steve Brodie as Frank Bricolle
Robert Osterloh as Joe Corsi
Barbara Billingsley as Ruth Campbell
Russell Hicks as District Attorney Randolph
James Seay as Rodd Simpson
Chet Huntley as Himself
Tommy Noonan as Sad Sam Carney 
William Gould as First Judge
Harry Harvey, Sr. as Second Judge
Garry Owen as Jerry
Charles Wagenheim as Al Markham

References

External links 
 

1949 films
1940s English-language films
20th Century Fox films
American crime films
1949 crime films
Films directed by Edward L. Cahn
American black-and-white films
1940s American films